Events from the year 1745 in Russia

Incumbents
 Monarch – Elizabeth I

Events

  
 
 21 August - The marriage between the future Catherine the Great, and the heir to the throne, Peter, is celebrated.

Births

February 24 - Fyodor Ushakov (d. 1817)

Deaths

References

1745 in Russia
Years of the 18th century in the Russian Empire